John F. Kennedy Park is a public park in the Vine City neighborhood of Atlanta, Georgia. The park, named after former United States president John F. Kennedy, was reopened in 2019 following an extensive renovation.

History 
Prior to Super Bowl LIII, which was held at the nearby Mercedes-Benz Stadium in Atlanta, the park received a $2.4 million renovation, which included the installation of a new playground and an artificial turf field. Groundbreaking occurred on August 22, 2018. On January 31, 2019, Atlanta Mayor Keisha Lance Bottoms, NFL Commissioner Roger Goodell, and Atlanta Falcons owner Arthur Blank officially reopened the park. The renovation was funded by contributions from the National Football League Foundation and the Arthur Blank Family Foundation.

See also
 List of memorials to John F. Kennedy

References

Bibliography 

 
 
 
 

Parks in Atlanta
English Avenue and Vine City